The William King Beck House, also known as River Bluff Plantation, is a historic plantation house on the Alabama River near Camden, Alabama.  The main house was built in 1845 for William King Beck and is attributed to architect Alexander J. Bragg.  William King Beck was an attorney from North Carolina who migrated to Wilcox County in the 1820s.  He was the nephew of William Rufus King, the 13th Vice President of the United States.

The house is a one-story wood-frame building with six octagonal columns supporting a full-width front porch under the main roof.  It is an example of the Greek Revival Cottage style.  The roof line was altered in the late 19th century, when the original hipped roof was replaced with a pyramidal type.  The house was added to the National Register of Historic Places on May 21, 1993.

References

National Register of Historic Places in Wilcox County, Alabama
Historic districts in Wilcox County, Alabama
Houses on the National Register of Historic Places in Alabama
Houses completed in 1845
Greek Revival houses in Alabama
Properties on the Alabama Register of Landmarks and Heritage
Plantation houses in Alabama
Houses in Wilcox County, Alabama
Historic districts on the National Register of Historic Places in Alabama